Delicately Violent is the second release and first EP by Israeli alternative rock band Eatliz, released on December 24, 2009, on the band's live shows, as well as on Anova Records' webstore. The EP was released on iTunes internationally on January 25, 2010.

The EP consists of 6 outtakes from the band's debut album Violently Delicate as well as a newly recorded cover of Björk's "Army of Me" which is a known cover the band plays live from its earliest years.

It is the band's first release to feature Hadar Green on bass.

Track listing

Personnel
Lee Triffon - lead vocals
Guy Ben Shetrit - guitar, vocals
Amit Erez - guitar, vocals
Or Bahir - guitar
Hadar Green - bass, vocals
Omry Hanegby - drums, percussion

References

2009 EPs
Eatliz albums